Indoor cycling (Artistic cycling and Cycle ball) and BMX freestyle (as part of the extreme sports) at the 2005 Asian Indoor Games was held in Nimibutr Stadium, Bangkok, Thailand from 14 November to 17 November 2005.

Medalists

BMX freestyle

Indoor

Medal table

Results

BMX freestyle

Flatland
15–16 November

Park
15–17 November

Park best trick
16 November

Indoor

Men's singles 
14 November

Men's pair 
15 November

Women's singles 
14 November

Women's pair 
15 November

Cycle ball

Qualifying round
17 November

Knockout round

References
 Hong Kong cycling federation

2005 Asian Indoor Games events
Asian Indoor Games
2005